(also written 2008 AO112) is an Apollo near-Earth asteroid and potentially hazardous object. It was discovered on 12 January 2008 by the Mount Lemmon Survey at an apparent magnitude of 21 using a  reflecting telescope. On 25 June 2009, with an observation arc of only 1 day in January 2008, the asteroid had a 1 in 4 million chance of impacting Earth on that very day. The virtual impactor had not been eliminated from the Sentry Risk Table by the day of the potential impact.

Precovery images from 7 April 1997 at Kitt Peak National Observatory were located. It was removed from the Sentry Risk Table on 30 March 2013. It is now known that on 25 June 2009 the asteroid was 1.45 AU from Earth.

References

External links 
 
 
 

Minor planet object articles (unnumbered)

Discoveries by MLS

20080112